Rundall is a surname. Notable people with the surname include: 

Francis Rundall (1908–1987), British diplomat
Mary Ann Rundall (died 1839), British educational writer

See also
Randall (surname)
Rendall (surname)
Rundell (disambiguation)